XHSD-FM/XESD-AM is a combo radio station in Silao, Guanajuato, Mexico, primarily serving León. XHSD-FM/XESD-AM broadcasts on 99.3 FM and 1530 AM and carries a contemporary hit radio format known as @FM (Arroba FM). 1530 kHz is a United States clear-channel frequency.

History
The concession for XESD-AM was awarded in January 1964. The FM counterpart was authorized in 1994.

In March 2018, Multimedios Radio took over operation of three Grupo Radiorama stations in León, Guanajuato, including XHSD-FM/XESD-AM. Under Multimedios, the station aired its La Lupe Spanish adult hits format. The change was undone when Multimedios stopped leasing several stations from Radiorama on August 1, 2020.

References

1964 establishments in Mexico
Contemporary hit radio stations in Mexico
Grupo Radiorama
Radio stations established in 1964
Radio stations in Guanajuato
Spanish-language radio stations